The National Conciliation Party is a small Egyptian political party.

History and profile
The National Conciliation Party was established in 2000. It was the second party accepted by the Political Party Affairs Committee since the 1950s.

The party presses for reaching a solution to the Palestinian issue. It also calls for achieving an Arab economic integration, establishing the common Arab market and maintaining the Arab national security. The party nominated its head, Refaat Al-Agroudy, to run for Egypt's first multi-candidate presidential elections in 2005.

References

2000 establishments in Egypt
Arab nationalism in Egypt
Arab nationalist political parties
Nationalist parties in Egypt
Political parties established in 2000